The 26th Tactical Missile Squadron is an inactive United States Air Force unit. It was activated in 1959 as the 26th Air Defense Missile Squadron to provide missile air defense for New England and was stationed at Otis Air Force Base, Massachusetts, where it was inactivated on 30 April 1972.  It received its current name in 1985. when it was consolidated with the 26th Tactical Reconnaissance Squadron, a World War II unit that provided reconnaissance support for ground units in training until it was disbanded in 1943.

History

World War II
The first predecessor of the squadron was activated at Gray Field, Washington in March 1942 as the 26th Observation Squadron and assigned to the 70th Observation Group.  It was initially equipped with North American O-47s.  The squadron participated in maneuvers and provided reconnaissance support for Army ground forces training in the Pacific coast region.  Until September 1942, the squadron also flew antisubmarine patrols off the coast.

In 1943, the squadron began to fly Bell P-39 Airacobras, becoming the 26th Reconnaissance Squadron (Fighter).  With these aircraft it added fighter support to its training mission.  In the spring of 1943, it moved with the 70th Group to Salinas Army Air Base, California.  It became the 26th Tactical Reconnaissance Squadron in August, but continued its mission from Pacific bases until moving to Will Rogers Field, Oklahoma in November 1943, where it was disbanded.

Air defense of New England
The 26th Air Defense Missile Squadron was activated at Otis Air Force Base on 1 March 1959 and stood alert during the Cold War, equipped with IM-99 (later CIM-10) BOMARC surface to air antiaircraft missiles.  The squadron was tied into a Semi-Automatic Ground Environment (SAGE) direction center which could use analog computers to process information from ground radars, picket ships and airborne aircraft to accelerate the display of tracking data at the direction center to quickly direct the missile site to engage hostile aircraft.    It was inactivated on 30 April 1972.

Although located outside of the base (but within the borders of the Massachusetts Military Reservation, it was treated as an off base facility and the squadron received administrative and logistical support from Otis.

In 1985, the squadron was consolidated with the 26th Tactical Reconnaissance Squadron, but has never been active with this designation.

Lineage
 26th Tactical Reconnaissance Squadron
 Constituted as the 26th Observation Squadron (Light) on 5 February 1942
 Activated on 2 March 1942
 Redesignated 26th Observation Squadron on 4 July 1942
 Redesignated 26th Reconnaissance Squadron (Fighter) on 2 April 1943
 Redesignated 26th Tactical Reconnaissance Squadron on 11 August 1943
 Disbanded on 30 November 1943
 Reconstituted on 19 September 1985 and consolidated with the 26th Air Defense Missile Squadron as the 26th Tactical Missile Squadron

 26th Air Defense Missile Squadron
 Constituted as the 26th Air Defense Missile Squadron on 23 January 1959
 Activated on 1 March 1959
 Inactivated on 30 April 1972
 Consolidated with the 26th Tactical Reconnaissance Squadron as the 26th Tactical Missile Squadron on 19 September 1985

Assignments
 70th Observation Group (later 70th Reconnaissance Group, 70th Tactical Reconnaissance Group), 2 March 1942 – 30 November 1943
 Boston Air Defense Sector, 1 March 1959
 35th Air Division, 1 April 1966
 21st Air Division, 19 November 1969 – 30 April 1972

Stations
 Gray Field, Washington, 2 March 1942
 Salinas Army Air Base, California, 15 March 1943
 Redmond Army Air Field, Oregon, 16 August 1943
 Corvallis Army Air Field, Oregon, 31 October 1943
 Will Rogers Field, Oklahoma, 14–30 November 1943
 Otis Air Force Base, Massachusetts, 1 March 1959 – 30 April 1972

Awards

Aircraft and missiles
 North American O-47, 1942-1943
 Bell P-39 Airacobra, 1943
 Boeing IM-99 (later CIM-10) BOMARC, 1959 -1972

See also
 List of United States Air Force missile squadrons

References

Bibliography

 
 
 
 
 AF Pamphlet 900-2, Unit Decorations, Awards and Campaign Participation Credits Department of the Air Force, Washington, DC, 15 June 1971
 AF Pamphlet 900-2, Unit Decorations, Awards and Campaign Participation Credits, Vol II Department of the Air Force, Washington, DC, 30 September 1976]

External links

026